The retroperitoneal space (retroperitoneum) is the anatomical space (sometimes a potential space) behind (retro) the peritoneum. It has no specific delineating anatomical structures.  Organs are retroperitoneal if they have peritoneum on their anterior side only. Structures that are not suspended by mesentery in the abdominal cavity and that lie between  the parietal peritoneum and abdominal wall are classified as retroperitoneal.

This is different from organs that are not retroperitoneal, which have peritoneum on their posterior side  and are suspended by mesentery in the abdominal cavity. 

The retroperitoneum can be further subdivided into the following:
Perirenal (or perinephric) space 
Anterior pararenal (or paranephric) space
Posterior pararenal (or paranephric) space

Retroperitoneal structures
Structures that lie behind the peritoneum are termed "retroperitoneal". Organs that were once suspended within the abdominal cavity by mesentery but migrated posterior to the peritoneum during the course of embryogenesis to become retroperitoneal are considered to be secondarily retroperitoneal organs.
 Primarily retroperitoneal, meaning the structures were retroperitoneal during the entirety of development: 
 urinary
 adrenal glands
 kidneys
 ureter
 circulatory
 aorta
 inferior vena cava
 digestive  
anal canal
 Secondarily retroperitoneal, meaning the structures initially were suspended in mesentery and later migrated behind the peritoneum during development
 the duodenum, except for the proximal first segment, which is intraperitoneal
 ascending and descending portions of the colon (but not the transverse colon, sigmoid and the cecum)
 pancreas, except for the tail, which is intraperitoneal

Subdivisions

Perirenal space
It is also called the perinephric space. Bounded by the anterior and posterior leaves of the renal fascia. It contains the following structures:
 Adrenal gland
 Kidney
 Renal vessels
Perirenal fat, which is also called the "adipose capsule of the kidney" and may be regarded as being part of the renal capsule

Anterior pararenal space
Bounded by the posterior layer of peritoneum and the anterior leaf of the renal fascia. It contains the following structures:
 Pancreas
 Ascending and descending colon
 Duodenum

Posterior pararenal space
Bounded by the posterior leaf of the renal fascia and the muscles of the posterior abdominal wall. It contains only fat ("pararenal fat"), and is also called the "paranephric body", or "pararenal fat body".

Clinical significance
Bleeding from a blood vessel or structure in the retroperitoneal such as the aorta or inferior vena cava into the retroperitoneal space can lead to a retroperitoneal hemorrhage.

 Retroperitoneal fibrosis
 Retroperitoneal lymph node dissection

It is also possible to have a neoplasm in this area, more commonly a metastasis; or very rarely a primary neoplasm. The most common type is a sarcoma followed by lymphoma, extragonadal germ cell tumor, and gastrointestinal stromal tumor/GIST. Examples of tumors include

Primary retroperitoneal carcinoma 
Pseudomyxoma peritonei
Examples of sarcomas include:
Soft-tissue sarcoma
liposarcoma
leiomyosarcoma 
Undifferentiated pleomorphic sarcoma, a clinically distinct sarcoma of the area

See also 
 Intraperitoneal

References

Abdomen